Dichocrocis alluaudalis is a species of moth of the family Crambidae.

It can be found in South Madagascar. The holotype had been collected Ambovombe in the region of Androy.

Its wingspan is 24 mm.

References 

Spilomelinae
Moths of Madagascar
Moths of Africa
Moths described in 1953